The Minister of Education, Culture and Science is the head of the Ministry of Education, Culture and Science and a member of the Cabinet and the Council of Ministers. The current Minister of Education, Culture and Science is Robbert Dijkgraaf of the Democrats 66 (D66) who has been in office since 10 January 2022. The Minister of Education, Culture and Science is often assigned a State Secretary who is tasked with specific portfolios, currently held by Gunay Uslu (D66). Additionally there is a Minister without Portfolio assigned to the Ministry of Education, Culture and Science Dennis Wiersma of the People's Party for Freedom and Democracy (VVD).

List of Ministers of Education
For full list, see List of Ministers of Education, Culture and Science of the Netherlands.

List of Ministers without Portfolio

List of State Secretaries for Education

List of Ministers of Social Work

List of State Secretaries for Social Work

See also
 Ministry of Education, Culture and Science

References

Education